The Glacier River is a river  southwest of Whittier near the Kenai Peninsula in Alaska. It rises in a remote valley from a glacial meltwater lake from Twentymile glacier and flows out into a large, wide valley where it receives the water of the Carmen River. The river ends abruptly after  as it is joined by the Twentymile River. It was named by Captain E. F. Glenn in 1898.

References

Rivers of Alaska